Goretown (also Gore Town) is an unincorporated community in Horry County, South Carolina, United States. Goretown is located east of Loris along SC 9 Business.

Notes

Unincorporated communities in Horry County, South Carolina
Unincorporated communities in South Carolina